Mohamoud Mohamed may refer to:

 Ahmed Mohamed Mohamoud (born 1936), Somaliland politician, former President
 Mohamed Mohamoud Handule (died 2016), Somalian diplomat
 Mohamoud Mohamed Guled (born 1954), Somalian politician
 Mohamoud Mohamed (born 2003), a victim of the 2020 Manchester stabbing
 Mohamed Ahmed Mohamoud, Somalian politician
Hussein Mohamed Mohamoud, Somalian politician